Alla behöver, is a 1993 Freda' studio album, released to LP, cassette tape and CD. The album was rereleased to CD in 2008.

Track listing 
Lyrics and music: Uno Svenningsson & Arne Johansson.

 Vart är vi på väg?
 Så länge jag lever
 Låt det alltid finnas
 Öppen för dig
 Det som gör mig lycklig
 Stanna hos dig
 Alla behöver
 Mina ögon vill se
 För din skull
 Du och ingen annan

Contributors (Freda') 
Uno Svenningsson - vocals, guitar
Arne Johansson - guitar, keyboard, omnichord
Mats Johansson - drums, percussion

Other musicians 
Mats "Limbo" Lindberg - bass
Sven Lindvall - bass
Stoffe Wallman - synthesizer
Johan Vävare - synthesizer

Charts

References 

1993 albums
Freda' albums
Swedish-language albums